Laura Oline Hedvig Brun-Pedersen (19 July 1883 – 7 March 1961) was a Danish painter. Born in Copenhagen, she studied art at the painting schools of Ernst Goldschmidt (1917–18) and Harald Giersing (1919-20). She painted deeply coloured landscapes with human figures and animals, often with scenes of forests. Many are painted on the island of Thurø near Svendborg where she lived for 30 years. In 1956, she was awarded the Thorvaldsen Medal. She died on 7 March 1961 and is buried in Assistens Cemetery.

References

Literature

1883 births
1961 deaths
20th-century Danish painters
Danish landscape painters
Danish women painters
Artists from Copenhagen
Recipients of the Thorvaldsen Medal
20th-century Danish women artists
20th-century Danish artists
Burials at Assistens Cemetery (Copenhagen)